Chebanse Township is one of twenty-six townships in Iroquois County, Illinois, USA.  As of the 2010 census, its population was 3,109 and it contained 1,263 housing units.

Geography

Cities, towns, villages
 Chebanse (south three-quarters)
 Clifton

Cemeteries
The township contains Saint Mary & Joseph Cemetery and Evergreen Cemetery.

Major highways
  Interstate 57
  U.S. Route 45

Airports and landing strips
 Nottke Airport

Demographics

School districts
 Central Community Unit School District 4

Political districts
 Illinois' 15th congressional district
 State House District 75
 State House District 105
 State Senate District 38
 State Senate District 53
 Iroquois County Board District 1

References
 
 United States Census Bureau 2007 TIGER/Line Shapefiles
 United States National Atlas

External links
 City-Data.com
 Illinois State Archives

Townships in Iroquois County, Illinois
Townships in Illinois